The Italian general election of 2006 took place on 10–11 April 2006.

In Trentino the centre-right came first narrowly ahead of the centre-left, as it happened nationally, while in South Tyrol the South Tyrolean People's Party led the centre-left to a major victory, but lost almost 10% of the vote from 2001 due to the alliance with Italian parties.

Results

Chamber of Deputies

Trentino

|-
|- bgcolor="#E9E9E9"
!rowspan="1" align="left" valign="top"|Coalition leader
!rowspan="1" align="center" valign="top"|votes
!rowspan="1" align="center" valign="top"|votes (%)
!rowspan="1" align="left" valign="top"|Party
!rowspan="1" align="center" valign="top"|votes
!rowspan="1" align="center" valign="top"|votes (%)
|-
!rowspan="9" align="left" valign="top"|Romano Prodi
|rowspan="9" valign="top"|165,413
|rowspan="9" valign="top"|50.1

|align="left"|The Olive Tree
Democracy is Freedom – The Daisy
Democrats of the Left
|valign="top"|99,131
|valign="top"|30.0
|-
|align="left"|South Tyrolean People's Party
|valign="top"|16,738
|valign="top"|5.1
|-
|align="left"|Communist Refoundation Party
|valign="top"|14,834
|valign="top"|4.5
|-
|align="left"|Italy of Values
|valign="top"|8,923
|valign="top"|2.7
|-
|align="left"|Federation of the Greens
|valign="top"|8,368
|valign="top"|2.5
|-
|align="left"|Rose in the Fist
Italian Democratic Socialists
Italian Radicals
|valign="top"|7,451
|valign="top"|2.3
|-
|align="left"|Party of Italian Communists
|valign="top"|4,774
|valign="top"|1.5
|-
|align="left"|Pensioners' Party
|valign="top"|3,994
|valign="top"|1.2
|-
|align="left"|others
|valign="top"|1,200
|valign="top"|0.4

|-
!rowspan="6" align="left" valign="top"|Silvio Berlusconi
|rowspan="6" valign="top"|164,036
|rowspan="6" valign="top"|49.7

|align="left"|Forza Italia
|valign="top"|76,355
|valign="top"|23.1
|-
|align="left"|National Alliance
|valign="top"|30,773
|valign="top"|9.3
|-
|align="left"|Lega Nord
|valign="top"|25,947
|valign="top"|7.9
|-
|align="left"|Union of Christian and Centre Democrats
|valign="top"|25,819
|valign="top"|7.8
|-
|align="left"|Tricolour Flame
|valign="top"|2,264
|valign="top"|0.7
|-
|align="left"|others
|valign="top"|2,878
|valign="top"|0.9

|-
!rowspan="1" align="left" valign="top"|Others
|rowspan="1" valign="top"|529
|rowspan="1" valign="top"|0.2

|align="left"|others
|valign="top"|529
|valign="top"|0.2

|-
|- bgcolor="#E9E9E9"
!rowspan="1" align="left" valign="top"|Total coalitions
!rowspan="1" align="right" valign="top"|329,978
!rowspan="1" align="right" valign="top"|100.0
!rowspan="1" align="left" valign="top"|Total parties
!rowspan="1" align="right" valign="top"|329,978
!rowspan="1" align="right" valign="top"|100.0
|}
Source: Ministry of the Interior

South Tyrol

|-
|- bgcolor="#E9E9E9"
!rowspan="1" align="left" valign="top"|Coalition leader
!rowspan="1" align="center" valign="top"|votes
!rowspan="1" align="center" valign="top"|votes (%)
!rowspan="1" align="left" valign="top"|Party
!rowspan="1" align="center" valign="top"|votes
!rowspan="1" align="center" valign="top"|votes (%)
|-
!rowspan="8" align="left" valign="top"|Romano Prodi
|rowspan="8" valign="top"|231,935
|rowspan="8" valign="top"|74.6

|align="left"|South Tyrolean People's Party
|valign="top"|165,966
|valign="top"|53.4
|-
|align="left"|The Olive Tree
Democracy is Freedom – The Daisy
Democrats of the Left
|valign="top"|33,458
|valign="top"|10.8
|-
|align="left"|Federation of the Greens
|valign="top"|16,753
|valign="top"|5.4
|-
|align="left"|Communist Refoundation Party
|valign="top"|4,711
|valign="top"|1.5
|-
|align="left"|Rose in the Fist
Italian Democratic Socialists
Italian Radicals
|valign="top"|3,915
|valign="top"|1.3
|-
|align="left"|Italy of Values
|valign="top"|3,315
|valign="top"|1.1
|-
|align="left"|Party of Italian Communists
|valign="top"|2,127
|valign="top"|0.7
|-
|align="left"|others
|valign="top"|1,609
|valign="top"|0.5

|-
!rowspan="5" align="left" valign="top"|Silvio Berlusconi
|rowspan="5" valign="top"|62,344
|rowspan="5" valign="top"|20.1

|align="left"|Forza Italia
|valign="top"|30,323
|valign="top"|9.8
|-
|align="left"|National Alliance
|valign="top"|21,366
|valign="top"|6.9
|-
|align="left"|Union of Christian and Centre Democrats
|valign="top"|5,342
|valign="top"|1.7
|-
|align="left"|Lega Nord
|valign="top"|2,809
|valign="top"|0.9
|-
|align="left"|others
|valign="top"|2,504
|valign="top"|0.8

|-
!rowspan="1" align="left" valign="top"|Pius Leitner
|rowspan="1" valign="top"|16,654
|rowspan="1" valign="top"|5.4

|align="left"|Die Freiheitlichen
|rowspan="1" valign="top"|16,654
|rowspan="1" valign="top"|5.4

|-
|- bgcolor="#E9E9E9"
!rowspan="1" align="left" valign="top"|Total coalitions
!rowspan="1" align="right" valign="top"|310,933
!rowspan="1" align="right" valign="top"|100.0
!rowspan="1" align="left" valign="top"|Total parties
!rowspan="1" align="right" valign="top"|310,933
!rowspan="1" align="right" valign="top"|100.0
|}
Source: Ministry of the Interior

Elections in Trentino-Alto Adige/Südtirol
2006 elections in Italy